The 2015 Clemson Tigers football team represented Clemson University in the 2015 NCAA Division I FBS football season. The Tigers were led by head coach Dabo Swinney in his seventh full year and eighth overall since taking over midway through 2008 season. They played their home games at Memorial Stadium, also known as "Death Valley." Clemson competed in the Atlantic Division of the Atlantic Coast Conference. On December 5, 2015, the Tigers won the 2015 ACC Championship Game by defeating the North Carolina Tar Heels, 45–37, capping their first undefeated regular season since winning the national title in 1981.  Ranked No. 1 throughout the College Football Playoff (CFP) rankings, Clemson defeated the No. 4 Oklahoma Sooners, 37–17, in the 2015 Orange Bowl to advance to the College Football Playoff National Championship.  Despite the success of the season, and entering the championship game with an undefeated record (14–0), they lost to the No. 2 Alabama Crimson Tide (13–1) in the national championship, 45–40.  Both Clemson and Alabama finished the season 14–1.

Schedule
Clemson announced their 2015 football schedule on January 29, 2015. The 2015 schedule consisted of seven home and five away games in the regular season. The Tigers hosted ACC foes Boston College, Florida State, Georgia Tech, and Wake Forest, and travelled to Louisville, Miami, NC State, and Syracuse.  Clemson hosted #4 seed Oklahoma in the Orange Bowl in the first round of the 2015-16 College Football Playoff.  The Tigers then hosted #2 seed Alabama in the 2016 College Football Playoff National Championship in University of Phoenix Stadium.

Schedule source:

Roster

Recruiting class

Game summaries

Wofford

Appalachian State

Louisville

Notre Dame

Georgia Tech

Boston College

Miami (FL)

NC State

Florida State

Syracuse

Wake Forest

South Carolina

ACC Championship Game

CFP Playoff

Orange Bowl- CFP Semifinal Game

CFP Championship Game

Rankings

2016 NFL Draft
The Tigers had nine players drafted in the 2016 NFL draft.  Shaq Lawson was picked first at 19th overall.  Nine draftees is the most for Clemson since the 1983 NFL draft.  It also gave the Tigers the second highest number of draftees in the 2016 NFL draft, second only to Ohio State with 12 players selected.

Awards and honors
National Coach of the Year Awards
Dabo Swinney: AFCA, AP, CBS Sports, Home Depot, Maxwell Foundation, Paul "Bear" Bryant, Phil Steele, Sporting News, Sports Illustrated, Walter Camp

Broyles Award Finalist
DC Brent Venables

Archie Griffin Award
Deshaun Watson

Davey O'Brien Award
Deshaun Watson

Manning Award
Deshaun Watson

Heisman Trophy Finalist
Deshaun Watson (3rd)

All-Americans
QB Deshaun Watson‡: 1st Team - AP, AFCA, Athlon, FWAA, CBS Sports, ESPN, USA Today; 2nd Team - Walter Camp, Sporting News, Sports Illustrated
DE Shaq Lawson‡: 1st Team - AP, AFCA, FWAA, Walter Camp, ESPN, USA Today; 2nd Team - Athlon, CBS Sports, Sporting News, Sports Illustrated
SS Jayron Kearse: 1st Team - ESPN; 2nd Team - AP, Athlon, CBS Sports, Sports Illustrated
TE Jordan Leggett: 2nd Team - Walter Camp; 3rd Team - Athlon, Honorable Mention - Sports Illustrated
CB Mackensie Alexander: 2nd Team - Athlon; 3rd Team - AP; Honorable Mention - Sports Illustrated
K Greg Huegel: 2nd Team - Sports Illustrated; Freshman Team - USA Today
LB Ben Boulware: Honorable Mention - Sports Illustrated
OT Mitch Hyatt: Freshman Team - FWAA, Sporting News, USA Today
DT Christian Wilkins: Freshman Team - FWAA, Sporting News

‡ - Consensus All-Americans

ACC Coach of the Year
Dabo Swinney

ACC Player of the Year
Deshaun Watson

ACC Offensive Player of the Year
Deshaun Watson

All-ACC:
1st Team: QB Deshaun Watson, WR Artavis Scott, OG Eric MacLain, DE Shaq Lawson, DT Carlos Watkins, CB Mackensie Alexander
2nd Team: RB Wayne Gallman, TE Jordan Leggett, C Jay Guillermo, LB Ben Boulware, LB B. J. Goodson, S Jayron Kearse, K Greg Huegel
3rd Team: OG Tyrone Crowder, OT Joe Gore, OT Mitch Hyatt, CB Cordrea Tankersley

References

Clemson
Clemson Tigers football seasons
Atlantic Coast Conference football champion seasons
Orange Bowl champion seasons
Clemson Tigers football